Hammarstrand is a locality and the seat of Ragunda Municipality in Jämtland County, Sweden with 1,052 inhabitants in 2010. The town is host to a bobsleigh and luge track. It was built on the dry bed of the former lake Ragundasjön, which drained suddenly and catastrophically in 1796.

Bobsleigh and luge track
Constructed in 1964, the track was 1045 meters long with 11 curves and a start height of 900 meters.
Its last World Cup luge competition was held in 1990. Until the completion of the bobsleigh and luge track used for the 1994 Winter Olympics at Lillehammer in 1992, it was the only track of its kind in Scandinavia. The track was the last natural track to host the FIL European Luge Championships and was the last natural track to host the FIL World Luge Championships until the 2000 event in St. Moritz, Switzerland. Its last use was in 2001.

Track statistics

Championships hosted
FIL European Luge Championships: 1970, 1976, 1978, 1986
FIL World Luge Championships: 1967, 1975, 1981

Gallery

References

External links 

Hammarstrand track map 
Official website 
Vilhussen information on Hammarstrand 
Hammarstrands camping

Populated places in Ragunda Municipality
Municipal seats of Jämtland County
Jämtland
Swedish municipal seats
Bobsleigh, luge, and skeleton tracks
Defunct sports venues in Sweden